Lewis Gustave Hansen (November 18, 1891 – November 18, 1965) was an American lawyer, judge, and politician who was the  Democratic nominee for Governor of New Jersey in 1946.

Biography
Hansen was born in 1891 in Jersey City, New Jersey. He received a master's degree from New York University School of Law in 1913 and was a counsellor-at-law in New Jersey beginning in 1916. He served one term in the New Jersey General Assembly before becoming first assistant prosecutor in Hudson County. From 1933 to 1940 he was first assistant corporation counsel in Jersey City. He was then appointed by Governor A. Harry Moore to the Second District Court of Jersey City.

Hansen resigned his judicial position in 1946 to run for Governor of New Jersey against the Republican candidate Alfred E. Driscoll. He lost by more than 221,000 votes. Following his defeat he was campaign manager in 1949 for the City Commission ticket in Jersey City backed by political boss Frank Hague. The ticket was unsuccessful, as John V. Kenny defeated Hague's nephew, Frank H. Eggers, in the Jersey City mayoral race. Hansen was reported to have been the first person to greet Kenny on the day he was sworn in.

Hansen served as Surrogate of Hudson County before retiring in 1957 to Oceanport, New Jersey. In 1965 he died in West Palm Beach, Florida on his 74th birthday.

References

1891 births
1965 deaths
Republican Party members of the New Jersey General Assembly
Politicians from Jersey City, New Jersey
People from Oceanport, New Jersey
New York University School of Law alumni
New Jersey lawyers
New Jersey state court judges
20th-century American judges
20th-century American politicians
20th-century American lawyers